The Frank Prize in Public Interest research was established in 2014 by the University of Florida and named in honor of social change pioneer Frank Karel. The award is given out annually for research that advances public interest communications around positive social change, including issues such as education, health, politics, and the environment. According to the website, the prize "celebrates peer-reviewed research that informs the growing discipline of public interest communications". Eligible disciplines include psychology, neuroscience, public relations, advertising, marketing, journalism, sociology, communications, public health, and political science. After two rounds of independent review by a panel of scholars and practitioners, three awards are made each year with a top financial prize of $10,000.  Recipients present their research at the annual Frank Scholar conference organized by the University of Florida. Notable behavioral science scholars such as Paul Slovic and Dan Ariely have presented at the conference.

Recipients

2020 
 Jon Roozenbeek and Sander van der Linden, University of Cambridge

2019 
 Jeremy Yip, Georgetown University

2018 
 Chelsea Schein and Kurt Gray, University of North Carolina, Chapel Hill

2017 
 Lisa Fazio, Vanderbilt University

2016 
 Troy Campbell, University of Oregon
 Julia Fraustino, West Virginia University 
 Jeff Niederdeppe, Cornell University

2015 
 Sara Bleich, Johns Hopkins University 
 David Sleeth-Keppler, Humboldt State University 
 Brendan Nyhan, Dartmouth College

2014 
 Jina Yoo, Washington University in St. Louis
 Frank Edwards, University of Washington 
 Jennifer Chun, University of Toronto

See also

 List of psychology awards

References

Academic awards
Articles containing video clips
Awards established in 2014
International awards
American psychology awards